Travacò Siccomario is a comune (municipality) in the Province of Pavia in the Italian region Lombardy, located about 35 km south of Milan and about 4 km southeast of Pavia, near the confluence of the Po and Ticino rivers.

Travacò Siccomario borders the following municipalities: Cava Manara, Linarolo, Mezzanino, Pavia, Rea, San Martino Siccomario, Valle Salimbene, Verrua Po.

Twin towns
 Camaret-sur-Aigues, France

External links
 Official website

Cities and towns in Lombardy